Paula Jo Weishoff (born May 1, 1962 in Hollywood, California) is a retired female volleyball player from the United States. She won two medals with the USA National Women's Team at the Summer Olympics: 1984 (silver) and 1992 (bronze). 

Weishoff also competed at the 1996 Summer Olympics, finishing in seventh place. A 1980 graduate of West High School in Torrance, California, she was inducted in the Volleyball Hall of Fame in 1998.

She played on the USC team for one season (1980), "where she earned all-America and all-conference acclaim en route to leading Trojans to [the] national championship."

International competitions
1981 – NORCECA (gold)
1982 – World Championships (bronze)
1983 – NORCECA (gold)
1983 – Pan American Games (silver)
1984 – Summer Olympics (silver)
1986 – Goodwill Games (bronze)
1986 – World Championships
1991 – NORCECA Championships (silver)
1991 – World Cup
1992 – Summer Olympics (bronze)
1992 – FIVB Super Four (bronze)
1995 – World Grand Prix (gold)
1996 – Summer Olympics (7th place)

Coaching career
After retiring from professional playing, she became a volleyball coach. She was the head coach of the Concordia University Eagles Women's Volleyball team and then transferred to UC Irvine to coach the women's team. She served under Head Coach Hugh McCutcheon of the United States women's national volleyball team for the 2012 Summer Olympics in London, as an assistant coach along with assistant coach Karch Kiraly.

Personal

References

External links
 
 US Olympic Team
 
 

1962 births
Living people
American women's volleyball players
Volleyball players at the 1984 Summer Olympics
Volleyball players at the 1992 Summer Olympics
Volleyball players at the 1996 Summer Olympics
Olympic silver medalists for the United States in volleyball
Olympic bronze medalists for the United States in volleyball
People from Hollywood, Los Angeles
Sportspeople from California
Medalists at the 1992 Summer Olympics
Medalists at the 1984 Summer Olympics
Competitors at the 1986 Goodwill Games
USC Trojans women's volleyball players
Pan American Games medalists in volleyball
Pan American Games silver medalists for the United States
Medalists at the 1983 Pan American Games